Stupid.com was a website that sold gag-gift products such as bizarre assortments of toys, candy, and kitchen utensils.

According to the website, it is the "best source of Stupid Gifts, Stupid Toys, Stupid Candy, and pointless useless, weird, ridiculous, and funny stuff." It also features games and cartoons.

In 2009, major changes were made to the site's overall appearance.

Gary Apple created the website in 1999 and relinquished site ownership in 2009.

Products
Stupid.com sold various novelty gifts. These included food items, such as gummi soldiers and fighter planes, all of which the site labeled as "stupid".

References

External links
 
 Gary Apple bio

Online retailers of the United States
Retail companies established in 1999
Internet properties established in 1999
1999 establishments in the United States